BNT Rupsha is a Damen Stan Tug 3008 class Fleet Coastal Tug of the Bangladeshi Navy. She was commissioned to Bangladeshi Navy on 3 October 2004.

Design
BNT Rupsha is a medium harbor tug. This ship was built at Khulna Shipyard with Dutch technical assistance. She incorporate many equipment and materials of South Korean origin.

See also
List of active ships of the Bangladesh Navy
BNT Shibsha

References

Ships built at Khulna Shipyard
Tugboats of the Bangladesh Navy